Comet 322P/SOHO, also designated P/1999 R1, P/2003 R5, P/2007 R5, and P/2011 R4, is the first periodic comet to be discovered using the automated telescopes of the SOHO (SOlar and Heliospheric Observatory) spacecraft, and second to be given a numbered designation, after 321P/SOHO. JPL Horizons next predicts 322P to come to perihelion (closest approach to the Sun) at 2019-Aug-31 12:25 UT.

The periodicity of this comet was predicted by Sebastian Hönig, a German graduate student and prolific asteroid discoverer, in 2006. The announcement of the new periodic comet was made after the predicted return was confirmed by SOHO and observer Bo Zhou on 10 September 2007. Out of approximately 1,350 SOHO-observed sungrazer comets, this is the first to be verified as a short-period comet; most sungrazers are long-period comets on near-parabolic orbits that do not repeat for thousands of years, if at all.

As it passed to within 7.9 million kilometres of the Sun, around 0.05 AU, it brightened by a factor of around a million. This is common behavior for a comet.

P/2007 R5 is probably an extinct comet.  Extinct comets are those that have expelled most of their volatile ice and have little left to form a tail or coma. They are theorized to be common objects amongst the celestial bodies orbiting close to the Sun.  P/2007 R5 (SOHO) is probably only 100–200 meters in diameter.

It was expected to return in September 2011, and was recovered by B. Zhou on September 6, 2011. It has a 2.8 hour light curve period suggesting its rotation. It is uncertain whether to classify it as a dead comet or asteroid.

Discovery credit goes to Terry Lovejoy (Australia, 1999), Kazimieras Černis (Lithuania, 2003), and Bo Zhou (China, 2007).

The second periodic comet discovered by SOHO is P/2003 T12 (SOHO).

It was observed again in September 2019.

References

External links 
 Orbital simulation from JPL (Java) / Ephemeris
 SOHO's first officially periodic comet
 SOHO Comets  (view real-time images)

322P
0322
322P
Comets in 2015
19990904